White line fever may refer to:

Highway hypnosis, an altered mental state induced by driving great distances
White Line Fever (film), a 1975 American film
 "White Line Fever", a 1977 song by Motörhead from their debut album Motörhead 
White Line Fever (TV series), an Australian-rules football show
White Line Fever (book), a 2002 autobiography by Lemmy